The Rink Hockey European Championship is a European roller hockey competition organised by World Skate Europe – Rink Hockey and contested by the best men's national teams. 

Spain are the current champions, after defeating France 2–1 (after extra time) in the 2021 final to win their eighteenth title. The most successful team is Portugal, who have won the competition twenty-one times.

Results

Tournaments

Medal table

See also 
Rink Hockey Female European Championship
World Skate Europe - all competitions

External links
CIRH website
Federação de Patinagem de Portugal
Real Federation Espanola de Patinaje
Federazione Italiana Sport Rotellistici

Recurring sporting events established in 1926
Roller hockey competitions